Aïn Soltane may refer to:

In Tunisia:
 Aïn Soltane, Tunisia

In Algeria:
 Aïn Soltane, Aïn Defla, a municipality or commune in Aïn Defla Province
 Aïn Soltane, Souk Ahras, a municipality or commune in Souk Ahras Province
 Aïn Soltane, Saïda, a municipality or commune in Saïda Province
 Aïn Soltane, Bordj Bou Arréridj, a municipality or commune in Bordj Bou Arréridj Province